Kravtsovo is a rural locality (a khutor) in Radchenskoye Rural Settlement, Bogucharsky District, Voronezh Oblast, Russia. The population was 81 as of 2010. There are 6 streets.

Geography 
Kravtsovo is located 49 km south of Boguchar (the district's administrative centre) by road. Batovka is the nearest rural locality.

References 

Rural localities in Bogucharsky District